"Love Who Loves You Back" is a song by German rock band Tokio Hotel from their fifth studio album, Kings of Suburbia (2014). It was released on 26 September 2014 as the album's lead single.

Music video
The music video, directed by Marc Klasfeld, was shot in Los Angeles. A 30-second teaser of the music video was posted on the Official Tokio Hotel Facebook page. The music video was released 30 September 2014 on the band's official Facebook page and 1 October on the band's official YouTube channel.

Track listing
Digital download
"Love Who Loves You Back" – 3:49

Charts

References

2014 singles
2014 songs
Island Records singles
Polydor Records singles
Song recordings produced by Rock Mafia
Tokio Hotel songs
Songs written by David Jost
Songs written by Bill Kaulitz
Songs written by Tom Kaulitz
Songs written by Tim James (musician)
Songs written by Antonina Armato